Claudia Bernardi (born 1955) is an Argentinian artist who works in the fields of art, human rights and social justice, combining installation, sculpture, painting and printmaking. She has worked with communities that have suffered state terror, violence, forced exiles and who are victims of human rights violations.

Bernardi was born in Buenos Aires. She is Professor of Community Arts, Diversity Studies, Critical Studies at the California College of the Arts.

Collections
Bernardi's work is held in the following permanent collections:
La Salle University Art Museum, La Salle University, Philadelphia, Pennsylvania: 1 piece (as of 11 February 2022)
Scottsdale Museum of Contemporary Art, Scottsdale, Arizona: 2 pieces (as of 11 February 2022)

Publications
The Tenacity of Memory. Palgrave Macmillan, 2018.

References

Argentine painters
Argentine women painters
Argentine women sculptors
21st-century Argentine women artists
Artists from Buenos Aires
Living people
1955 births